The Ministry of Youth and Sports is a government ministry of Nepal that governs the development of young people and sports in the country.

Former Ministers of Youth and Sports
This is a list of former Ministers of Youth and Sports since the Nepalese Constituent Assembly election in 2013:

References

Youth and Sports
Nepal